Lutpulla Mutellip (Uyghur: لۇتپۇللا مۇتەللىپ; November 22, 1922 – September 18, 1945), also known as Qaynam Orkishi, Lutun, or Li Mutalifu (Chinese:黎·穆塔里甫), was a Uyghur poet and journalist. He is considered one of the most important figures in modern Uyghur literature. Although he died young at the age of 22, he had a strong influence on modern Uyghur literature and especially on Uyghur poetry. His poems are reputed for the beauty of his language. "Response to Years" (Yillargha Jawap) is considered to be his poetic masterpiece and "Thoughtful Blessings" (Xiyalchan Tilek) is another one of his most famous works.

For his work and writing on Uyghur independence, he is remembered by some as a national hero for the Uyghur people.

Biography
He went to a Tatar school in Ghulja for elementary school. Lutpulla moved to Ürümqi after graduating from high school in 1939. He attended college at Ürümqi.

He worked a literature page editor for a gazette. He was exiled to Aksu City in 1943 for his poems because they were seen as criticisms of the Chinese government under Sheng Shicai and was eventually put in prison.

Death and burial
Lutpulla was executed in 1945 by Chinese authorities. He was buried in a graveyard in Aksu City. The graveyard was later destroyed and turned into a park called "Happiness Park". Chinese officials claim to have moved his remains to a "facility", although the exact location of this facility remains unknown as of July 2020.

Legacy
In August 1956, the People's Committee of the Xinjiang Uygur Autonomous Region ratified him as a revolutionary martyr.

Author Abdulla Talip wrote a book in 1982 called Whirlpool Wave that gave a fictionalized account of Mutellip's life.

Works 
 Lutpulla Mutallip Ăsărliri, Beijing: Millătlăr Năshriyati, 1981.
 Izbrannye proizvedeniia, Almaty: "Zhazushy", 1975.

References

Further reading 
 Tursun Arshidin, L. Mutăllip hăqqidă hikayă, Ürümchi: Shinjiang khălq năshriyati, 1982.
 Tursun Arshidin, Lutpulla Mutăllip vă uning kăchürmishliri, Ürümchi: Shinjiang khălq năshriyati, 1998.
 Talip Abdullah, Qaynam örkishi: biogirapik roman, Ürümchi: Shinjang yashlar năshriyati, 1982.

People from Ili
Uyghur poets
1922 births
1945 deaths
20th-century poets
Uyghur-language poets
20th-century executions by China